

Geography 
Lago di Comabbio is a lake in the Province of Varese, Lombardy, Italy.

Once it was part of the Lake of Varese, but now the two lakes are connected just by an artificial channel, which is even one of its greatest emissaries.

Wildlife 
In the lake it is forbidden to use motor boats, and thanks to this the growth of the wild life was possible.

The lake hosts different species of fishes such as: pikes, bluegills, craps and Tenches. Experts thinks that in the next years the fauna of this lake will be in serious danger, because of the most likely arrival of one of the most lethal predators in northern Italy: the Wels catfish. Who is yet causing serious problems in other lakes and rivers in northern Italy such as: Lake Maggiore, Lake Iseo and also in Po River.

Lakes of Lombardy